Tim Miller (born September 22, 1958, in Pasadena, California) is an American performance artist and writer, whose pieces frequently involve gay identity, marriage equality and immigration issues.  He was one of the NEA Four, four performance artists whose National Endowment for the Arts grants were vetoed in 1990 by NEA chair John Frohnmayer.

Life and career
Miller was born in Pasadena, California but grew up in nearby Whittier.

He has developed shows based on his personal life as a gay man and as an activist. A member of ACT UP and other campaigning organizations, Miller has participated in numerous demonstrations to call for funding of AIDS research and treatment and to promote equal rights. His civil disobedience has led to his arrest on several occasions.

Miller's interest in performance began in high school, where he took classes in theater and dance. He played the lead role of John Proctor in Lowell High School's production of The Crucible by Arthur Miller. At nineteen he moved to New York and studied dance with Merce Cunningham.

In 1980 Miller joined with Charles Moulton, Peter Rose and Charles Dennis to found P.S. 122, a space for performance art. The name derives from the former school building that houses the project. In 1987 Miller returned to California and with Linda Frye Burnham founded another performance space, Highways, in Santa Monica.

In 1993 Miller was featured in the episode of The Larry Sanders Show called The Performance Artist. He played himself as the titular performance artist, who appears as a guest both on Larry Sanders' show and on The Tonight Show with Jay Leno performing a portion of My Queer Body.

In 1997 Miller published Shirts & Skin, a compilation of personal stories that he had told in his shows over the previous decade. He also launched a show of the same name.

Miller took on a new topic, immigration rights for gay and lesbian partners of American citizens, in Glory Box (1999). The immigration issue is a personal cause as Alistair McCartney, his partner since 1994, is Australian.

In 2002 Miller published Body Blows, a collection of scripts from six of his shows with associated essays.

Miller returned to the theme of the problems of Americans with same-sex life partners in Us in 2003. The title refers both to his relationship with McCartney and to the laws in the United States which could prevent them from being together.

Productions

References

Bibliography

External links
 Official website
Tim Miller entry in GLBTQ: An Encyclopedia of Gay, Lesbian, Bisexual, Transgender & Queer Culture

1958 births
Living people
American gay artists
American gay writers
American performance artists
Lambda Literary Award for Drama winners
20th-century American dramatists and playwrights
21st-century American dramatists and playwrights
American male dramatists and playwrights
American LGBT dramatists and playwrights
20th-century American male writers
21st-century American male writers